Glenea sexnotata is a species of long-horned beetle found in the Western Ghats of India.

References

sexnotata
Insects of India